Jayasurya is an Indian actor, playback singer, and producer who works in Malayalam films.

Malayalam

1990s

2000s

2010s

2020s

Other languages

As producer 
As a producer, his debut venture was the movie Punyalan Agarbattis (2013).

Discography 
Jayasurya has recorded a devotional song album at Vani Studio, Kochi. The album, Krishnakavyam, was produced by Goodluck Audios.

Television

References

External links
 

Indian filmographies
Male actor filmographies